The 2013 season for the  cycling team began in January at the Tour Down Under. As a UCI ProTeam, they were automatically invited and obligated to send a squad to every event in the UCI World Tour.

On 21 December 2012, Nissan announced that they would cease to sponsor the team, with immediate effect.

Team roster
As of 1 January 2013.

Riders who joined the team for the 2013 season

Riders who left the team during or after the 2012 season

Season victories

Footnotes

References

2013 road cycling season by team
Trek–Segafredo (men's team)
2013 in Luxembourgian sport
2013 in American sports